Batman: In Darkest Knight is a one-shot, comic book, published in 1994 and written by Mike W. Barr with art by Jerry Bingham. The comic is an Elseworlds story in which Bruce Wayne becomes the Green Lantern instead of Hal Jordan. This one change creates a domino effect which alters many events and characters in the DC Universe. The story draws heavily from related Batman comics, including Batman: Year One and The Killing Joke.

The comic is dedicated to the memory of Bill Finger, who was "present at the birth of both" according to the afterword.

Plot
The story begins after Bruce Wayne's disastrous first attempt at crimefighting. As he sits in his study, wounded, he pleads with his dead father's image for some means by which to terrify the criminals of Gotham City. Suddenly, a ghostly image comes from a bust before him, telling him that he has been chosen. The figure heals his wounds and leads him to a crashed rocket on his property. Inside, the dying Green Lantern Abin Sur gives Bruce his power ring and tells him to wait for contact from its masters.  Bruce hides the rocket in the Batcave beneath his mansion and begins his crimefighting career.

His first mission is to capture the Red Hood robbers at a chemical plant. Using a combination of his powers and skills, Bruce manages to subdue all three and turn them over to Officer James Gordon, thus preventing the creation of The Joker. As Bruce flies off, Gordon tells district attorney Harvey Dent that he mistrusts vigilantes, especially those with super powers. Shortly afterwards, the Guardians of the Universe give Bruce his first official mission: stop the errant, power-hungry Sinestro, who abuses his Green Lantern ring for personal gain. Bruce manages to subdue Sinestro, leaving the people he once dominated despondent. When one of them, Katma Tui, says that Bruce is their hero, he gives her Sinestro's power ring before returning to Oa. Sinestro swears vengeance on Bruce before he is banished to Qward.

Back on Earth, Bruce goes to Gordon and asks for help in figuring out the identity of his parents' killer (without divulging his identity). Initially refusing, Gordon later sets to work and has almost found the answer when Sinestro appears, bearing a yellow power ring from the Weaponers of Qward. He steals the information and kills Gordon, then sets off. Sinestro finds Joe Chill and uses his power ring to absorb the man's mind. When Bruce shows up to investigate Chill's dead body, he is ambushed by Sinestro, who exhibits dual personalities thanks to Chill's mind. Bruce manages to drive the criminal off, which leads Sinestro to acquire allies on Earth.

Days later, Bruce has an encounter with two people who have been empowered and mind-altered by Sinestro: Attorney Dent has been scarred on the face and driven mad by the transformation, and cat burglar Selina Kyle has become a Star Sapphire. Though Bruce defeats Dent and Kyle, they escape back to Sinestro, who watches as Bruce sets up a system of observer satellites in orbit. During his absence, Sinestro has been causing chaos on other planets in the sector, causing the Guardians to question Bruce's role as a Lantern. However, he refuses to give up his ring, leading the Guardians to contact three other worthy Earthlings - Clark Kent, Queen Hippolyta of the Amazons, and Barry Allen - to become additional Green Lanterns.

Some time later, Bruce is patrolling the city when four Lanterns, including Katma Tui, attack him and attempt to restrain him. Taking advantage of his distraction, Sinestro leads his forces to attack Bruce's cave, injuring Alfred Pennyworth in the process, and begins tampering with the power battery when the three new Green Lanterns appear and battle the villains. Bruce is subdued, but senses that Alfred is in danger and regains his ring as it responds to his will. Rushing home, he finds Alfred dead and Sinestro escaped. The three Lanterns beg him to stay and teach them, but Bruce refuses, asking them to protect the Earth while he hunts down Sinestro.

Multiverse
This Elseworld is part of Earth 32 of the 52 universes of the Multiverse. This character appears in Countdown: Arena #1-2. He and two other Green Lanterns fight against Monarch in the second issue.

In other media
 Batman as a Green Lantern is a playable character in Lego Batman 3: Beyond Gotham.

References

Elseworlds titles
Green Lantern titles